Ktzat Acheret or Ketzat Aheret (Hebrew: קצת אחרת, A Little Different) was an Israeli progressive rock band that existed between 1974–75. The band comprised Shlomo Gronich, Shem Tov Levi and Shlomo Idov. Ktzat Acheret is also the name of the only album that the band released.

"Ktzat Acheret" began as a group accompanying Nurit Galron at the beginning of her musical career. After an independent show, the trio began a show trip around the country with songs that they wrote.

The unique and original sound of the group, that was one of the unique progressive rock band considered in the country for that period, was being heard from Israeli musicians, but didn't succeed commercially. The lack of commercial success led to the dissolution of the band. Shlomo Gronich left Israel to seek a career outside the country and study music in New York City.

The album

Before the dissolution of the band, Ktzat Acheret completed recording of the album Ktzat Acheret. The arrangements for strings and bassoon were performed by Gronich and Levi. The original album has twelve songs, where the first one "Traveling" (In Hebrew: שיר הנסיעה) described the trip the trio did around the country. Other songs of the album that became classics were "The Little Prince" (In Hebrew: הנסיך הקטן), "Pink Skies" (In Hebrew: שיר בין ערביים), "Two Chinese" (In Hebrew: שניים סינים) and the album's closing song "Bissalad" (In Hebrew: ביסלט), relating to the songs of The Beatles and is a tribute to the band reveres three.

The album, recorded in the Triton studio, was produced by Joseph Orbach.

References

Israeli rock music groups
Musical groups established in 1974
Musical groups disestablished in 1975
Israeli progressive rock groups